Sir Roger de Mowbray of Barnbougle, Dalmeny and Inverkeithing, was a Scottish noble. He was Sheriff of Edinburgh and Haddington in 1263.

He was the eldest son of Philip de Mowbray and Galiena filia Waltheof. Roger had a brother Nigel. He was sheriff of Edinburgh and Haddington in 1263. Roger married Christiana.

Citations

References

Year of birth unknown
Year of death unknown
Medieval Scottish knights
13th-century Scottish people